WQWV is a Classic Hits formatted broadcast radio station licensed to Fisher, West Virginia, serving Petersburg and Moorefield in West Virginia.  WQWV is owned and operated by Thunder Associates, LLC.

References

External links
 V103-7 FM Online
 

1998 establishments in West Virginia
Classic hits radio stations in the United States
Radio stations established in 1998
QWV